The Men's keirin at the 2014 UCI Track Cycling World Championships was held on February 27. 21 cyclists participated in the contest. After the four qualifying heats, the fastest rider in each heat advanced to the second round. The riders that had not advanced to the second round, raced in four repechage heats. The first two riders in each heat advanced to the second round along with the four that qualified before.

The first three riders from each of the two Second Round heats advanced to the Final and the remaining riders raced a consolation 7–12 final.

Medalists

Results

First round
The first round was started at 13:10.

Heat 1

Heat 2

Heat 3

Heat 4

First round repechage
The first round repechage was started at 14:40.

Heat 1

Heat 2

Heat 3

Heat 4

Second round
The second round was started at 20:00.

Heat 1

Heat 2

Finals
The finals were started at 20:45.

Small final

Final

References

2014 UCI Track Cycling World Championships
UCI Track Cycling World Championships – Men's keirin